Anadenidae is a family of air-breathing land slugs, terrestrial pulmonate gastropod mollusks in the superfamily Arionidae.

Genera 
Two genera are recognised in the Family Anadenidae:
 Anadeninus Simroth, 1912
 Anadenus Heynemann, 1863 - type genus

References

Further reading 
 Gupta P. K. & Oli B. P. (1998). "The life cycle and growth of the slug, Anadenus altivagus (Theobald) from Kumaon Himalayan forests, India". Journal of Molluscan Studies 64: 250-253. 
 Kuzminykh A. A. & Schileyko A. A. (2005). "Slugs of the family Anadenidae Pilsbry, 1948 (Gastropoda, Pulmonata) with descriptions of two new subgenera and three new species". Ruthenica 15(2): 109-118.
 Schileyko A. A. (2007). "Treatise on Recent terrestrial pulmonate molluscs, Part 15 Oopeltidae, Anadenidae, Arionidae, Philomycidae, Succineidae, Athoracophoridae". Ruthenica, Supplement 2(15): 2049-2210.